Carluccio may refer to the following:

Carluccio (surname), Italian surname
Carluccio's Ltd, an Italian restaurant chain in the United Kingdom